Liga Deportiva Universitaria de Quito's 1972 season was the club's 42nd year of existence, the 19th year in professional football and the 13th in the top level of professional football in Ecuador.

Competitions

Serie A

First stage

Results

Second stage

Results

Relegation play-off

Results

References
RSSSF - 1972 Serie A

External links
Official Site 

1972